The heavyweight boxing competition at the 1980 Olympic Games in Moscow was held from 25 July to 2 August at the Olympiysky Sports Complex. 14 boxers from 14 nations competed.

Schedule

Results

References

Boxing at the 1980 Summer Olympics